Marcel Sendrail (31 August 1900 – 4 June 1976) was a French physician.

1900 births
1976 deaths
20th-century French writers
20th-century French physicians
French medical historians
French medical writers
Physicians from Toulouse
20th-century French historians
20th-century French male writers
French male non-fiction writers